Dundee House is the present headquarters of Dundee City Council, which opened in August 2011 to replace Tayside House. It was designed by Reiach and Hall and has won two prestigious architecture awards, including a Royal Institute of British Architects award for architectural excellence.

References 

Buildings and structures in Dundee
Politics of Dundee
Government buildings completed in 2011